St. John the Baptist Catholic Church is a historic church at the junction of New Orleans and W. Ash Street, SW corner in Brinkley, Arkansas. It was listed on the National Register of Historic Places in 1992.

Architecture
The church was built in 1875 as a wood-frame Gothic Revival structure, but was finished brick veneer with Classical Revival styling in 1928–29.  The congregation was established by a district priest in 1875, and received its first permanent priest in 1886.  The 1929 alterations, which included an extensive redesign of the interior, were to a design by Memphis, Tennessee architect Harry J. Kremer.  The interior is remarkably unaltered since 1929, despite the collapse of its plaster ceiling, which required the replacement of light fixtures and pews crushed by the falling ceiling.

References

Churches in the Roman Catholic Diocese of Little Rock
Churches on the National Register of Historic Places in Arkansas
Neoclassical architecture in Arkansas
Roman Catholic churches completed in 1929
Churches in Monroe County, Arkansas
National Register of Historic Places in Monroe County, Arkansas
20th-century Roman Catholic church buildings in the United States
Neoclassical church buildings in the United States